Firestone Farms is a shopping center located in Columbiana, Ohio along Ohio Route 14. Opened in 2016, Firestone Farms consists of a downtown-style district, known as Town Centre, and a planned traditional-style shopping hub, known as Marketplace. Firestone Farms is designed to be a retail park-style commercial cluster.

References

External links
Official Website

Buildings and structures in Columbiana County, Ohio
Buildings and structures in Mahoning County, Ohio
Commercial buildings completed in 2016
Columbiana, Ohio